No Longer My Own is the seventh studio album by Cheri Keaggy. Psalm 91 Records released the album on August 7, 2015. Keaggy self-produced the entire album.

Critical reception
{{Album ratings
| rev1 = CCM Magazine
| rev1Score = 
| rev4 = The Phantom Tollbooth
| rev4Score = 4/5
}}

Awarding the album three stars for CCM Magazine, Jamie Walker states, "No Longer My Own...showcases her classic alto vocals and knack for catchy piano driven melodies...The self-produced project is decisively pop with hints of gospel." Michael Dalton, giving the album a four out of five at The Phantom Tollbooth'', writes, "The music jogs along with a sober assessment of the pain and evil in the world...[noting]...Choices like this are indicative of the maturity found on this release."

Track listing

Personnel 
 Cheri Keaggy – lead vocals, backing vocals, acoustic piano 
 Blair Masters – keyboards, acoustic piano, accordion, pump organ
 David Cleveland – electric guitars, mandolin
 Scott Denté – acoustic guitars, backing vocals 
 Phil Keaggy – ukulele
 Matt Pierson – bass
 Ken Lewis – drums, percussion 
 Christine Denté – backing vocals 
 Jason Eskridge – backing vocals 

Production
 Cheri Keaggy – producer, executive producer, liner notes 
 Scott Denté – additional producer 
 Bill Whittington – vocal producer, engineer, mixing 
 Amy Marie – assistant engineer, mix assistant 
 Jim DeMain – mastering at Yes Master, Nashville, Tennessee
 Sandra Ney – creative direction 
 Sarah Newson – design
 Michael Gomez – photography

References

2015 albums